Ismael Silva Lima (born 1 December 1994), sometimes known as just Ismael, is a Brazilian footballer who plays as a central midfielder.

Club career
On 9 August 2017, he moved from Kalmar FF to the Russian Premier League club FC Akhmat Grozny.
On 17 May 2021, Akhmat Grozny announced that Ismael Silva had left the club after 114 games for the club.

On 25 July 2021, he signed with Al Faisaly in Saudi Arabia.

Career statistics

Club

Notes

References

External links
 
 

1994 births
Footballers from Rio de Janeiro (city)
Living people
Brazilian footballers
Association football midfielders
Kalmar FF players
FC Akhmat Grozny players
Al-Faisaly FC players
Allsvenskan players
Russian Premier League players
Saudi Professional League players
Saudi First Division League players
Brazilian expatriate footballers
Expatriate footballers in Sweden
Expatriate footballers in Russia
Expatriate footballers in Saudi Arabia
Brazilian expatriate sportspeople in Sweden
Brazilian expatriate sportspeople in Russia
Brazilian expatriate sportspeople in Saudi Arabia